Smith Farm is a small plantation or farm house, built  by Robert and Elizabeth Smith. It is Atlanta's oldest surviving farm house. It is a typical kind of plantation house owned by small farmers. The house was located in Dekalb County, Georgia on 800 acres (3.2 km2). The last Smith to occupy the property was Tullie, the great-great-granddaughter of Robert. By the 1960s the house was surrounded by highways and development, and was donated to the Atlanta Historical Society (now Atlanta History Center). The house was moved in 1969 to its present site on the grounds of the Atlanta History Center.

The farm was restored in January 1970. Chaired by Bettijo Hogan Cook (now Trawick), the original Tullie Smith Restoration Committee included Mrs. Ivan Allen Jr., Mr. Edward Daugherty, Mr. Dan Franklin, Mrs. Mary Gregory Jewett, Miss Isabelle Johnston, Mrs. Mills B. Lane, Mr. James Means, Mrs. Thomas E. Martin Jr., Mr. William R. Mitchell Jr., and Mrs. John C. Symmes. It is now operated by Atlanta History Center as a 19th-century historic house museum known as Smith Farm. Other buildings found on the farm property, including the enslaved people's cabin, dairy, blacksmith shop, smokehouse, corncrib, chicken coop, barn, and outhouse were brought from different parts of Georgia to represent aspects of the original farm.

The landscape represents the Smith Farm in its early era, with historic varieties of crops in the fields, the enslaved people's garden, the kitchen garden, and a swept yard by the house planted with heirloom flowers such as love-lies-bleeding (Amaranthus sp.) and rose campion (Lychnis coronaria). Surrounding the farm's outbuildings are naturalistic, native plantings. Heritage-breed sheep, goats, chickens, and turkeys are representative of the types of livestock found on this type of farm. Living history presentations are given during special events.

References

External links

Smith Farm at Atlanta History Center
Tullie Smith House, National Park Service Atlanta

National Register of Historic Places in Atlanta
Houses on the National Register of Historic Places in Georgia (U.S. state)
Historic house museums in Georgia (U.S. state)
Houses in Atlanta
Museums in Atlanta